Table tennis at the 2016 Summer Olympics in Rio de Janeiro took place from 6 to 17 August 2016 at the third pavilion of Riocentro. Around 172 table tennis players (equally distributed between men and women) competed in both the singles and team events. Table tennis had appeared at the Summer Olympics on seven previous occasions beginning with the 1988 Summer Olympics in Seoul. In addition to men's and women's singles, the team events were staged for the third time since replacing doubles events at the 2008 Summer Olympics in Beijing.

Qualification

As the host nation, Brazil had automatically qualified six athletes; a team of three men and women with one each competing in the singles.

The top 22 male and top 22 female players on the International Table Tennis Federation's Olympic ranking list as of January 1, 2016 were qualified for the singles event at the Games. No nation could have more than two players per gender in the singles at these Games, so some players below the twenty-eighth position were given a qualifying place based on ranking.

Forty places were awarded to the table tennis players with a maximum of two per NOC and gender through the following continental qualification tournaments between July 1, 2015 and April 24, 2016: six each from Africa and Latin America, eleven each from Asia and Europe, and three each from North America and Oceania. One invitational place per gender was allocated by the International Table Tennis Federation (ITTF).

For the team events, the highest-ranked NOC from each continent that already contained two qualified players for the singles added a quota place to form a team of three players and thereby secured a direct qualifying place for the Games based on the ITTF Olympic Team Ranking list. The remaining ten teams were allotted to the nine highest-ranked NOCs in any continent and to the host nation Brazil (if not qualified by any means) that have two players qualified for the singles. If less than nine nations, the next best teams with a single player would have secured a place for the Olympics.

Competition schedule

Participating

Participating nations
A total of 172 athletes (86 men and 86 women), representing 56 NOCs, competed in four events.

Competitors

Medal summary

Medal table

Events

See also
Table tennis at the 2016 Summer Paralympics
2016 ITTF World Tour
2016 ITTF World Tour Grand Finals
2016 World Team Table Tennis Championships

References

External links

 
 Results Book : Rio 2016. Organising Committee for the Olympic and Paralympic Games in Rio in 2016.
 
 Table Tennis at the 2016 Summer Olympics at Olympedia.org

 
2016 Summer Olympics events
2016 in table tennis
Table tennis competitions in Brazil
2016